Alangulam is a town in Tenkasi district, Tamil Nadu, India. It is a Special Grade  Town Panchayat and the centre of the Alangulam Taluk in Tenkasi  district.

Geography
It is situated at an average elevation of 127 metres (416 feet).

Demographics
 India census, Alangulam had a population of around 17,922 as per the 2001 census. Males constitute 49% of the population and females 51%. Alangulam has an average literacy rate of 69%, higher than the national average of 59.5%; with 54% of the males and 46% of females literate. 14% of the population is under 6 years of age.

Government and Politics

Assembly Constituency
Alangulam is a constituency for the Tamil Nadu Legislative Assembly. P. H. Manoj Pandian has been the elected Assembly Member for Alangulam in the 2021 Tamil Nadu Legislative Assembly election.

Firkas under Alangualm Taluk
Alangulam is the administrative centre of the Alangulam taluka within Tirunelveli District, and is subdivided into following five Firka.

 Keelapavoor
 Nettur, Ayyanarkulam
 Nallur
 Venkatampatti
 Kuruvan Kottai

Notable people
 

Aladi Sankaraiya, politician

Transportation
Alangulam is connected by state highways to Tirunelveli (29 km) towards the east, to Tenkasi (24 km) towards the west, to Ambasamudram (20 km) towards the south, to Surandai (17 km) towards the north west Sankarankovil (48 km) towards the north.

References

External links
 www.alangulam.in

Cities and towns in Tirunelveli district